The Skeleton mixed team competition at the IBSF World Championships 2020 was held on 1 March 2020.

Results
The race was started at 10:04.

References

Skeleton mixed team